Myslovitz - The Best Of is a greatest hits album by Polish alternative rock group Myslovitz released in 2003.

Track listing 

Side 1

 "Scenariusz dla moich sąsiadów" - 3:12 
 "Sprzedawcy marzeń" - 3:47
 "Kraków - Grechuta" - 3:28
 "Krótka piosenka o miłości" - 3:35
 "Z twarzą Marilyn Monroe" - 2:46
 "Książka z drogą w tytule" - 4:31
 "Maj" - 6:27
 "Blue Velvet" - 2:50
 "Margaret" - 4:05
 "Acidland" - 4:08
 "To nie był film" - 3:34
 "Chłopcy" - 3:58
 "Good Day My Angel" - 6:58
 "Myslovitz (A Capella)" - 0:47

Side 2

 "Myslovitz" - 3:57
 "Długość dźwięku samotności" - 4:10
 "Zwykły dzień" - 3:12
 "Kraków (Original)" - 04:09
 "Historia jednej znajomości" - 6:48
 "Polowanie na wielbłąda" - 5:12
 "Dla Ciebie" - 3:46
 "Sekrety i kłamstwa" - 4:19
 "Peggy Brown" - 3:32
 "Zgon" - 2:32
 "My" - 3:26
 "The Iris Sleeps Under the Snow" - 6:52
 "Sei Taing Kya" - 5:41

Myslovitz albums
2003 greatest hits albums